Adib Barakat (born 6 June 1982 in Syria) is a Syrian footballer who plays as a defender for Bowsher, which competes in the Omani First Division and is a former member of the Syria national football team.

References

External links
 

1982 births
Living people
Syrian footballers
Association football defenders
Syria international footballers
Syrian expatriate footballers
Expatriate footballers in Iraq
Expatriate footballers in Oman
Syrian expatriate sportspeople in Iraq
Footballers at the 2006 Asian Games
Asian Games competitors for Syria
Syrian Premier League players